Ageneiosus vittatus is a species of driftwood catfish of the family Auchenipteridae. It can be found in the Amazon basin and the Orinoco River.

References

Further reading
Eschmeyer, William N., ed. 1998. Catalog of Fishes. Special Publication of the Center for Biodiversity Research and Information, num. 1, vol. 1–3. California Academy of Sciences. San Francisco, California, United States. 2905. .

Ageneiosus
Fish described in 1908
Freshwater fish of Brazil
Fish of Venezuela